The Yellow Jackets Motorcycle Club is a historic Motorcycle Club, established in Southern California right around World War II and whose members primarily ride American  made motorcycles such as Harley Davidson. Common Nicknames for the club are "YJMC", "25", and "Black and Yellow".

History 
The Gardena, Los Angeles and Hemet, California Yellow Jackets Motorcycle Club, the "Original" Yellow Jackets, are an "Historic Motorcycle Club".
Incorporated in 1947, The Yellow Jackets Motorcycle Club is one of many historic clubs still in existence in the United States.
Early Southern California clubs included the 13 Rebels, the Yellow Jackets, the Orange County Motorcycle Club, and the Boozefighters, whose actions during the Hollister riot were fictionalized in the film The Wild One starring Marlon Brando, and whose formation in 1946 marks the beginning of the "one percenter" outlaw motorcycle clubs.
They met at a small bar called the 'Crash Inn' in Southern California, and eventually made the owner an honorary member. Many different clubs were represented at the Crash Inn including The Sharks, The 13 Rebels, The Top Hatters, the Boozefighters, and the Hounds. The Gardena/Hemet/Los Angeles chapters were represented at the July 4th, 1947 Hollister, California celebration. this became known as the Hollister riot, depicted in the film The Wild One and often referenced as the birthplace of the American outlaw biker

The Yellow Jackets MC is an international club. Formed as a racing club, The Yellow Jackets MC along with the other "Original Motorcycle Clubs", set the stage for the development of the modern American motorcycle club. From its roots in the California motorcycle culture, the club began to spread eastward, growing its ranks with new members, and absorbing members from other clubs.

The Original Yellow Jackets competed in races sanctioned by the American Motorcycle Association (AMA).
The last surviving member of the Originals, Bob McMillen left us in 2016.

Several notorious Boozefighters raced while wearing Yellow Jackets colors such as 'Wino' Willy Forkner (out of Los Angeles). Wino started his own chapter The Los Angeles Yellow Jackets to race under in American Motorcycle Association (AMA) sanctioned events.

Modern Club 
Today, the Yellow Jackets Motorcycle Club is an American motorcycle club riding American or Allied motorcycles of the "cruiser" style. Their aim is to bring back the culture of the immediate post-WW2 American Motorcycle Club. Yellow Jackets are open to men 21 years of age of more, who own a qualifying motorcycle.

The Motorcycle Club life is not for everyone, as prospective members are first asked to hang around, then prospect before being asked to join the club. At every phase of the process a member must prove his commitment to the club. The Yellow Jackets are a fully integrated and diverse club, and do not discriminate or show preference based on race, creed, or color.

Colors 
Yellow Jackets MC members are identified by their historic 1948 back patch as seen above.

References 

Motorcycle clubs in the United States
History of Los Angeles County, California
Gardena, California
Hemet, California